This is a list of German women's magazines.

Mass market magazines
 Amica
 Auf einen Blick
 Bild der Frau
 Brigitte, published by Gruner + Jahr
 Brigitte Woman
 Brigitte Young Miss
 Frau im Spiegel
 Freundin, published by Hubert Burda Media
 Für Sie, published in Hamburg by Jahreszeiten Verlag
 Gala, published by Gruner + Jahr
 Das Goldene Blatt, published by WAZ Women Group
 Jolie, published by OZ Druck und Verlag
 Joy, published by Marquard Media AG
 Madame
 Maxi
 Myself
 Neue Post
 Petra
 Woman

No longer published:
 Allegra
 Journal für die Frau

Feminist magazines 
 Femina Politica, first published in 1997
 Missy Magazine, first published in 2008

No longer published:
 Beiträge zur feministischen Theorie und Praxis, published 1978-2008
 Die Hexenpresse – Zeitschrift für feministische Agitation, published 1972-1976
 Der Weg der Frau, feminist/communist magazine published 1931-1933

German editions of foreign magazines 
 Cosmopolitan
 Elle
 Glamour
 Grazia
 InStyle
 Vogue

Unsure of publication status:
 Elle Girl

 
Women's magazines
German women's
Magazines